Vasilios Mavroidis (15 November 1926 – 2002) was a Greek athlete. He competed in both the 800 metres and the 1500 metres at the 1948 Summer Olympics and the 1952 Summer Olympics.

References

1926 births
2002 deaths
Athletes (track and field) at the 1948 Summer Olympics
Athletes (track and field) at the 1952 Summer Olympics
Greek male sprinters
Greek male middle-distance runners
Olympic athletes of Greece
Place of birth missing
20th-century Greek people